Mastophora, also known as bolas spiders, is a genus of orb-weaver spiders first described by E. L. Holmberg in 1876. They can be identified by a pair of lumps on the dorsal surface of the opisthosoma, though not all males will have these lumps.

Adult females of the genus snare prey mid-air by using a silk line with an adhesive blob on the end, similar to bolas used by South American gauchos. They feed on flying insects, particularly moths, sometimes releasing pheromones that mimic those of their prey to attract them. Males and juvenile females capture their prey directly with their legs. Mastophora spiders have extreme sexual size dimorphism: adult females reach 0,75 inches (19 mm), while adult males are smaller than 0,067 inches (1,7 mm). These spiders reach maturity after two instars, or fewer. Cephalothorax often with dorsal protuberances, frequently paired. Female abdomen large, wider than long, an occasion has dorsal humps or lobes. Prey specialization by means of aggressive chemical mimicry.

Species

 it contains fifty species:
Mastophora abalosi Urtubey & Báez, 1983 – Argentina
Mastophora alachua Levi, 2003 – USA
Mastophora alvareztoroi Ibarra & Jiménez, 2003 – USA, Mexico
Mastophora apalachicola Levi, 2003 – USA
Mastophora archeri Gertsch, 1955 – USA
Mastophora bisaccata (Emerton, 1884) – USA, Mexico
Mastophora brescoviti Levi, 2003 – Brazil
Mastophora caesariata Eberhard & Levi, 2006 – Costa Rica
Mastophora carpogaster Mello-Leitão, 1925 – Brazil
Mastophora catarina Levi, 2003 – Brazil
Mastophora comma Báez & Urtubey, 1985 – Argentina
Mastophora conica Levi, 2006 – Argentina
Mastophora conifera (Holmberg, 1876) – Argentina
Mastophora cornigera (Hentz, 1850) – USA to Nicaragua
Mastophora corpulenta (Banks, 1898) – Mexico, Honduras, Nicaragua, Brazil
Mastophora corumbatai Levi, 2003 – Brazil
Mastophora cranion Mello-Leitão, 1928 – Brazil
Mastophora diablo Levi, 2003 – Argentina
Mastophora dizzydeani Eberhard, 1981 – Colombia, Peru
Mastophora escomeli Levi, 2003 – Peru
Mastophora extraordinaria Holmberg, 1876 – Brazil, Uruguay, Argentina
Mastophora fasciata Reimoser, 1939 – Costa Rica, Venezuela
Mastophora felda Levi, 2003 – USA
Mastophora felis Piza, 1976 – Brazil
Mastophora gasteracanthoides (Nicolet, 1849) – Chile
Mastophora haywardi Birabén, 1946 – Argentina
Mastophora holmbergi Canals, 1931 – Paraguay, Argentina
Mastophora hutchinsoni Gertsch, 1955 – USA, Canada
Mastophora lara Levi, 2003 – Venezuela
Mastophora leucabulba (Gertsch, 1955) – USA to Honduras
Mastophora leucacantha (Simon, 1897) – Brazil
Mastophora longiceps Mello-Leitão, 1940 – Brazil
Mastophora melloleitaoi Canals, 1931 – Brazil, Argentina
Mastophora obtusa Mello-Leitão, 1936 – Brazil
Mastophora pesqueiro Levi, 2003 – Brazil
Mastophora phrynosoma Gertsch, 1955 – USA
Mastophora pickeli Mello-Leitão, 1931 – Brazil
Mastophora piras Levi, 2003 – Brazil
Mastophora rabida Levi, 2003 – Ecuador (Galapagos Is.)
Mastophora reimoseri Levi, 2003 – Paraguay
Mastophora satan Canals, 1931 – Brazil, Uruguay, Argentina
Mastophora satsuma Levi, 2003 – USA
Mastophora seminole Levi, 2003 – USA
Mastophora soberiana Levi, 2003 – Panama
Mastophora stowei Levi, 2003 – USA
Mastophora timuqua Levi, 2003 – USA
Mastophora vaquera Gertsch, 1955 – Cuba
Mastophora yacare Levi, 2003 – Uruguay
Mastophora yeargani Levi, 2003 – USA
Mastophora ypiranga Levi, 2003 – Brazil

References

Araneidae
Araneomorphae genera
Spiders of North America
Spiders of South America